This is a list of places in Queensland by urban centre population.

Urban areas by population

Greater Capital City Statistical Areas/Significant Urban Areas by population

Local Government Areas by population

Regions by population

See also

 List of former local government areas of Queensland
 List of local government areas of Queensland
 List of cities in Australia by population
 List of places in New South Wales by population
 List of places in the Northern Territory by population
 List of places in South Australia by population
 List of places in Tasmania by population
 List of places in Victoria by population
 List of places in Western Australia by population

References 

Queensland
Queensland
Queensland, Places by population
Places by population